The Afterman refers to a double album by Coheed and Cambria:

The Afterman: Ascension, 2012 album
The Afterman: Descension, 2013 album
The Afterman (Live Edition), 2013 live album